9th Division, 9th Infantry Division or 9th Armoured Division may refer to:

Infantry divisions 
 9th Division (Australia)
 9th Infantry Division (Bangladesh)
 9th Division (People's Republic of China)
 9th Division (German Empire)
 9th Reserve Division (German Empire)
 9th Bavarian Reserve Division, World War I
 9th Landwehr Division, German Empire
 9th Infantry Division (Wehrmacht), Germany
 9th Luftwaffe Field Division (Germany)
 9th Mountain Division (Wehrmacht), Germany
 9th Infantry Division (Greece)
 9th (Secunderabad) Division, British Indian Army, before and during World War I
 9th Infantry Division (India)
 9th Division (Iraq)
 9th Division (Imperial Japanese Army)
 9th Division (Japan)
 9th Division (North Korea)
 9th Infantry Division (Ottoman Empire)

 9th Infantry Division (Philippines), Spear Division

 9th Division (Singapore)
 9th Division (South Africa)
 9th Infantry Division (South Korea)
 9th Division (South Vietnam)
 9th Infantry Division (Soviet Union)
 9th Infantry Division (Thailand)
 9th (Scottish) Division, World War I
 9th (Highland) Infantry Division, World War II
 9th Infantry Division (United States)
 9th Division (Vietnam)

Airborne divisions 
 9th Parachute Division (Germany)

Motorized divisions 
 9th Motorized Division (France)
 9th Motorised Division Pasubio, Kingdom of Italy

Cavalry divisions 
 9th Cavalry Division (German Empire)

Armoured divisions 
 9th Panzer Division (Wehrmacht), Germany
 9th SS Panzer Division Hohenstaufen, Germany
 9th Armoured Division (Greece)
 9th Tank Division (People's Republic of China)
 9th Tank Division (Soviet Union)
 9th Armoured Division (Syria)
 9th Armoured Division (United Kingdom)
 9th Armored Division (United States)

Aviation divisions 
 9th Space Division, United States

See also 
 Division No. 9 (disambiguation)